Magon or Magón may refer to:

People

The Flores Magón family of Mexico
Jesús Flores Magón (1871–1930), Mexican politician and journalist, secretary of the interior in 1912
Ricardo Flores Magón (1874–1922), Mexican anarchist of the Revolutionary period 
Enrique Flores Magón (1877–1954), Mexican anarchist of the Revolutionary period

The Magonid dynasty of Ancient Carthage
Mago I of Carthage or Magon, 6th century BCE
Mago II of Carthage or Magon, 4th century BCE
Mago III of Carthage or Magon, 4th century BCE

Other people
Mago (general), a Carthaginian general
Magon Barca, the brother of Hannibal Barca
Charles René Magon de Médine (1763–1805), French admiral
Manuel González Zeledón (1864–1936), Costa Rican writer who published under the nom-de-plume "Magón"
Jymn Magon (born 1949), U.S. television/film writer
Magon (musician), (born 1985), an Israeli musician

Places

Named for Ricardo Flores Magón
Metro Ricardo Flores Magón, a station of the Mexico City Metro
Eloxochitlán de Flores Magón, city in the state of Oaxaca, Mexico
Ricardo Flores Magón, Chiapas, in the municipality of Venustiano Carranza, Chiapas, Mexico
Ricardo Flores Magón, Chihuahua, a city in the area code for Chihuahua, Mexico
Ricardo Flores Magón, Durango, in the Canatlán Municipality, Mexico

Other places
Cair Magon (Latin: Magnae), the Sub-Roman citadel at Kenchester, Herefordshire, England
Teotitlán de Flores Magón, Oaxaca, Mexico, named for Enrique Flores Magón

Other uses
Several Tunisian wines named after Mago, the Carthaginian agricultural writer
Magón National Prize for Culture (named for Manuel González Zeledón), given by the government of Costa Rica
Popular Indigenous Council of Oaxaca "Ricardo Flores Magón" (CIPO-RFM)

See also
Mago (disambiguation)
Magonism, an anarchist school of thought based on the ideas of Ricardo Flores Magón